Tracy Lynn Brabin (born 9 May 1961) is a British politician who has served as the first Mayor of West Yorkshire since the office was established on 10 May 2021. She previously was the Member of Parliament (MP) for Batley and Spen from 2016 to 2021 under the Labour and Co-operative banner.

Born in Batley, Brabin was an actress and television writer prior to entering politics, appearing in several British soap operas including Coronation Street, EastEnders, Casualty and Emmerdale. She was elected for Batley and Spen in an October 2016 by-election after the murder of previous incumbent Jo Cox. She was appointed as Shadow Secretary of State for Digital, Culture, Media and Sport by Jeremy Corbyn in January 2020, succeeding former Deputy Labour Leader Tom Watson. In April 2020, new Labour Leader Keir Starmer removed Brabin from the Shadow Cabinet and appointed her Shadow Minister for Cultural Industries. She resigned as an MP after winning the 2021 West Yorkshire mayoral election. Her resignation triggered a by-election, which Labour's Kim Leadbeater won. She is the first ever woman to serve as a metro-mayor.

Early life
Brabin was born in Batley in the West Riding of Yorkshire, and educated at Heckmondwike Grammar School. She studied drama at Loughborough University and gained a Master of Arts degree in screenwriting from the London College of Communication of the University of the Arts London in 2001.

Arts career

Television
Brabin played clumsy waitress Sandra opposite David Jason in A Bit of a Do, Tricia Armstrong in Coronation Street from 1994 to 1997, and Ginny in three series of Richard Harris's Outside Edge. She appeared in EastEnders as Roxy Drake, The Ghost Hunter as Mrs Oliver, Love + Hate as Gaynor, and in an episode of Midsomer Murders ("Dead Letters", 2006).

In 2008, she appeared in a series of commercials for supermarket chain Sainsbury's playing Sarah, a mother-of-two and Sainsbury's employee who does her weekly shopping at the store. In 2014, she appeared as Lyndsey Bernstein in Law & Order: UK, Pam in Undeniable, and as Carole in Emmerdale.

Film
In Charles and Diana: Unhappily Ever After (1992), Brabin played Sarah, Duchess of York. In 2012, she played Maggie, a mother who comes to realise she is one of a race of aliens, in artist Shezad Dawood’s first feature, the sci-fi art-house film Piercing Brightness.

Theatre
Brabin played Linda, Sharon and Annie in Simon Beaufoy's play The Full Monty, an adaptation of his screenplay for the film, directed by Sheffield Theatre's Daniel Evans. The play opened at the Sheffield Lyceum to excellent reviews, followed by a national tour and a West End run at the Noël Coward Theatre. The production was nominated for the Best New Comedy at the Laurence Olivier Awards in 2014. Brabin's previous theatre performances include the lead role in Shelagh Stevenson's The Long Road at Curve in Leicester directed by Adel Al Salloum and Joy in Meat written by Jimmy Osbourne for London's 503 Theatre.

Writing
Brabin has written for Heartbeat, Family Affairs, Crossroads, The Story of Tracy Beaker, and Hollyoaks, on which she worked for two years. She has written for Shameless for Company Pictures and for three series of Seacht – nominated for Best Youth Programme Irish Film and Television Awards in 2011. With her mentor Elizabeth Karlsen, the producer of Made in Dagenham, she was involved on the romantic comedy feature Father August for the prestigious She Writes programme, with Minkie Spiro attached to direct. Brabin wrote an episode of Doctors which was screened in December 2012.

Political career
Brabin publicly endorsed the Labour Party at the 1997 general election, writing an article for the Labour-supporting Daily Mirror newspaper explaining that her father-in-law had died on a hospital trolley while waiting to see a doctor. In May 1998 she appeared in a party political broadcast for the Labour Party, appealing for people to join it. In March 2005, Brabin was the lead member of a group of nine actors to write to The Observer explaining that while they continued to oppose the Blair government's military intervention in Iraq, they still "strongly support the re-election of a Labour government". She canvassed for the Labour Party in the Kirklees council election in 2012.

When Jo Cox was selected as Labour candidate for Batley and Spen, Brabin joined her campaign against the closure of libraries in the constituency.

Parliamentary career

In August 2016, Brabin said that she was considering standing in the Batley and Spen by-election, caused by Cox's murder. On 19 September, she was shortlisted along with Labour activist Jane Thomas. Brabin was selected at a meeting on 23 September. The Conservative Party, Liberal Democrats, Green Party and UKIP did not field candidates as a mark of respect to Cox. On 20 October 2016, Brabin was elected with an increased majority of around 10,000. She was then sworn in on 24 October.

Brabin made her maiden speech in the House of Commons on 2 November, paying tribute to her predecessor, whom she described as "inspirational". The speech won applause from fellow MPs.

Brabin retained the seat in the 2017 general election, with a majority of just under 9,000 over the Conservative Party candidate. On 3 July 2017 she was appointed as Shadow Early Years Minister by Labour leader Jeremy Corbyn.

Brabin was re-elected as the MP for Batley & Spen in the 2019 General Election, with a majority of 3,525. She was appointed as Shadow Secretary of State for Digital, Culture, Media and Sport in January 2020 after the previous holder, Tom Watson stood down at the 2019 general election. She was replaced as Shadow Culture Secretary in Keir Starmer's Shadow frontbench announcement but made Shadow Minister for Cultural Industries.

In March 2021, a teacher at Batley Grammar School showed cartoons depicting Muhammad, the founder of Islam, from the French satirical magazine Charlie Hebdo during a religious studies lesson. This led to protests. The school apologised and suspended the teacher involved. The teacher was allegedly placed in police protection after receiving death threats. Brabin responded to this by stating that she condemned the threats towards the teacher, welcomed the apology given by the school, and urged "all involved to work together and calm the situation".

Mayor of West Yorkshire
Brabin was the Labour Party's nomination for the inaugural Mayor of West Yorkshire in the 2021 election. As a result, she stood down from her frontbench role to focus on her mayoral campaign, with Alison McGovern taking over her responsibilities. The mayoralty includes powers over transport, crime and planning in the region of 2.3 million people, which includes the cities of Leeds, Bradford and Wakefield.

In the election, held on 6 May 2021, Brabin won 43% of the first-round vote, failing to secure a majority, and 59.8% of transfer second-round votes, with the closest challenger being Matthew Robinson of the Conservative Party. This made her the first woman to be elected as a metro mayor. Upon taking office, she became entitled to the style of Mayor. Brabin follows two former Labour MPs – Andy Burnham and Steve Rotheram in Greater Manchester and the Liverpool City Region respectively – representing their regions as mayor, while Dan Jarvis, mayor of the Sheffield City Region, has concurrently remained the member of parliament for Barnsley Central. However, Brabin had to  resign her Batley and Spen seat, triggering a by-election, as Electoral Commission rules make the police and crime responsibilities in the role incompatible with being an MP.

Filmography

Television credits

Writing credits
Crossroads (2001)
The Story of Tracy Beaker (2003–2005)
Tracy Beaker Parties with Pudsey (2004)
Heartbeat (2005)
Family Affairs (2005)
Hollyoaks (2008–2010)
Shameless (2009)
Seacht (2011)
Doctors (2012)

References

External links
 
 
 
 

1961 births
20th-century English actresses
21st-century English actresses
21st-century English women politicians
21st-century English politicians
Actresses from Yorkshire
Alumni of Loughborough University
British actor-politicians
British women television writers
English soap opera actresses
English television actresses
English television writers
Female members of the Parliament of the United Kingdom for English constituencies
Labour Co-operative MPs for English constituencies
Labour Party (UK) MPs for English constituencies
Labour Party (UK) mayors
Living people
Mayors of places in Yorkshire and the Humber
People from Batley
People from Muswell Hill
UK MPs 2015–2017
UK MPs 2017–2019
UK MPs 2019–present
Women mayors of places in England
People educated at Heckmondwike Grammar School